Albert A. Boyajian (born June 4, 1940, Aleppo, Syria) is an American business leader and activist for Armenian causes.

He is the founder and chairman of the Armenian American Political Action Committee (A.A.P.A.C.), which promotes Armenian issues in Washington D.C. concerning free trade, social financial, cultural activities, and cooperation between Armenia and the United States government.

Biography
In 1968, he graduated from the University of Paris with a degree in Modern French Literature and then emigrated to the United States.

In 1978, he established the Global Bakeries, Inc. in the production & supply of food product, and has become a national and international enterprise and he currently serves as president and CEO.

In 1984, he established the first Armenian Youth Association Boy Scouts of America Pack.

In 1993, he founded the Boyajian Youth Center in Pasadena, California, that focuses on social activities and Art Gallery for children in the community.

In 1997, he led a team that secured 9.56 million University endowment from United States Government and he established an educational endowment fund for Pepperdine University.

He has donated over $1 million to Armenia Fund, Inc. and was awarded the Republican Senatorial Medal of Freedom.

External links
Albert A. Boyajian awarded the Ellis Island Medal of Honor
 Albert A. Boyajian among Honorees at AGBU Convention by THE ARMENIAN GENERAL BENEVOLENT UNION (AGBU)

1940 births
Living people
Syrian people of Armenian descent
People from Aleppo
University of Paris alumni
American philanthropists
American people of Armenian descent
Ethnic Armenian philanthropists
American food industry businesspeople
Armenian businesspeople
Ethnic Armenian businesspeople
Syrian Christians
Syrian emigrants to the United States
Syrian expatriates in France